Deadly Currents is a Canadian documentary film, directed by Simcha Jacobovici and released in 1991. The film explores the Israeli–Palestinian conflict, profiling various people on both sides of the dispute.

The Romans dispersed the Jews from Judaea in 70 AD; Islam became the religion of Palestine 1300 years ago. The film focuses on Gaza and the West Bank where soldiers and youths are caught up in the Intefada, and on the clash of history and ideas in regions to which both peoples have historical claims. The film intersperses in-the-street footage with interviews with academics, journalists, soldiers, artists, family members of prisoners, and victims of violence. With emphasis on the lives of the refugees and settlers, and following a "Golani" platoon of Israeli soldiers led by Lt. Kobi Motiv, the film dramatizes the irreconcilable positions of many on both sides

The film premiered theatrically at the 1991 Toronto International Film Festival, and had a theatrical run before airing on CBC Television in 1992. When the film screened in Jerusalem, it was heavily criticized by viewers on both sides of the dispute.

The film won the gold medal at the Nyon International Documentary Film Festival in 1991, and the Genie Award for Best Feature Length Documentary at the 13th Genie Awards.

References

External links
 

1991 films
1991 documentary films
Canadian documentary films
Best Documentary Film Genie and Canadian Screen Award winners
Films directed by Simcha Jacobovici
1990s English-language films
1990s Canadian films